Dendrobium section Spatulata is a section of the genus Dendrobium.

Description
Plants in this section have a erect cane like pseudobulbs with two leaves, blooming with a multi-flower inflorescence with twisted petals and a tri lobed lip.

Distribution
Plants from this section are found in Java and the Philippines to Australia and the Pacific Islands with the greatest concentration in New Guinea. Most of the species can be found at lower elevation close to sea level.

Species
Dendrobium section Spatulata comprises the following species:

Natural hybrids

References

Orchid subgenera